The 1975 IAAF World Race Walking Cup was held in Le Grand-Quevilly, France, on October 11–12, 1975. The event was also known as Lugano Trophy. For the first time, there was a women's 5 km race held as invitation event.

Complete results were published.

Medallists

†: Invitation event.

Results

Men's 20 km

Men's 50 km

Team (men)
The team rankings, named Lugano Trophy, combined the 20km and 50km events team results.

Women's 5 km†

†: Invitation event.

Team (women)†

†: Invitation event.

Participation
The participation of 109 athletes (71 men/38 women) from 14 countries is reported.

 (-/4)
 (8/-)
 (-/1)
 (8/5)
 (8/-)
 (8/-)
 (-/3)
 (-/4)
 (7/-)
 (8/5)
 (-/2)
 (8/4)
 (8/6)
 (8/4)

Qualifying rounds
From 1961 to 1985 there were qualifying rounds for the men's competition with the first two winners proceeding to the final. This year, the German Democratic Republic, the Soviet Union, Italy, the United States, and France proceeded directly to the final.

Zone 1
Odense, Denmark, September 20/21

Zone 2
Štětí, Czechoslovakia, September 20

See also
 1975 Race Walking Year Ranking

References

World Athletics Race Walking Team Championships
World Race Walking Cup
Cross
World Race Walking Cup